Sir Frank Samuel Tait (12 November 1883 – 23 August 1965) was an Australian theatre entrepreneur, managing director of J. C. Williamson's. He was the youngest of five Tait brothers, well known in Australia as show-business entrepreneurs and managers.

History
Tait was born on 12 November 1883 in Richmond, Victoria, the youngest son of John Turnbull Tait (1830–1902), who in 1862 emigrated from Scotland to Victoria, Australia, where he married Sarah Victoria Leeming (c. 1837 – 9 August 1923). They had children in Castlemaine, and one, Frank Samuel, in Melbourne. Tait attended Richmond State School and Melbourne Church of England Grammar School.

He became general manager of J. C. Williamson Theatres in 1914.

In February 1921 J. C. Williamson's Ltd created an additional 75,000 shares in the company, issued to the brothers John Henry Tait, Edward Joseph Tait, James Nevin Tait, and Frank Samuel Tait, trading as "J & N Tait", for £1 each. Tait was appointed a director of JCW around the same time.

He was co-founder in 1935 and co-proprietor of Village Theatre Ltd. with Hirsch Krantz, John Henry Tait, Karl Millbrook and Jascha Spivakosky, co-directors. Connection or otherwise with Village Roadshow or Village Cinemas has not been found.

In June 1938 Australian and New Zealand Theatres Ltd. was founded to control the assets of J. C. Williamsons. Initially  G. B. Dean, S. S. Crick, and Frank Tait served as joint managing directors, then around 1940 he became the managing director of Australian and New Zealand Theatres Ltd.

Later life and legacy
Tait was knighted in 1956 for services to the theatre and died in Portsea, Victoria on 23 August 1965, aged 81.

The Tait Memorial Trust, instituted in 1992, was named in his honour.

Family
Tait married twice, on 29 November 1913 to Iris Olga Field Barnard (c. 1893 – 19 August 1938) and (secondly) to the soprano Viola Wilson Hogg aka Viola Wilson (1 November 1911 – 6 February 2002) on 16 August 1941. They had a residence in Hopetoun Road, Toorak, Victoria. His children include:
Joan Iris Tait (1914 – before 2002) married John Masters on 5 April 1938. They had a daughter Diana Masters on 27 July 1939. She married (later Air-Commodore) Gordon Steege on 5 January 1946. Their son Peter Steege was born 1953.
Peggy Elfrida Tait (1916– ) married Alan Lionel Benjamin on 4 December 1941. Benjamin was a lawyer and debating champion. Both were involved in amateur theatre. She married again, to a Mr Cabot.
Peter Frank Tait (c. 1920 – 1928)
Ruth Tait (died before 2002)
Isla Frances Tait (born 30 May 1943) married Julian Baring (9 December 1935 – 5 September 2000) on 23 May 1970. They had two children. He was financier in London.
(Viola) Anne Tait (born 20 December 1944) married Oliver Streeton on 28 July 1968, adopted surname "Seddon".
Sally Tait (born 16 July 1949) married a Mr Bell

See also
Brothers of Frank S. Tait include:
Charles Tait (1868–1933)
John Henry Tait (1871–1955)
James Nevin Tait (1876–1961)
Edward Joseph Tait (1878–1947)
Stage people gave nicknames to the young Tait brothers: "Agitate" (J. H. Tait), "Irritate" (J. N. Tait), "Hesitate" (E. J. Tait), and "Cogitate" (F. S. Tait).

References 

1883 births
1965 deaths
Australian theatre owners
Show business families of Australia
Australian Knights Bachelor